Hureh may refer to:
 Hureh, Chaharmahal and Bakhtiari
 Hureh, Khuzestan
 Hureh Emir, Khuzestan Province
 Hureh-ye Agul-e Bala, Khuzestan Province
 Hureh Rural District, in Chaharmahal and Bakhtiari Province